Dave Cobb (born July 9, 1974) is an American record producer based in Nashville, Tennessee, best known for producing the work of Chris Stapleton, Brandi Carlile, John Prine, Sturgill Simpson, Jason Isbell, The Highwomen and Rival Sons .

Cobb is also a contributor to the six million-selling 2018 A Star Is Born soundtrack and produced "Always Remember Us This Way" for Lady Gaga

Early life 
Cobb was born in Savannah, Georgia, to Mary Cobb (née Floyd) and David Cobb, Sr. He went to The Cottage School in Roswell, Georgia.

Cobb said his family was very religious and was active in the Pentecostal faith (his maternal grandmother was a minister). Cobb started out playing drums and taking guitar lessons at church when he was four years old.

Career 
When Cobb was first starting in music, he worked as a session player in Atlanta, Georgia. He joined the band The Tender Idols, featuring Ian Webber (vocals), Danny Howes (guitar), Guy Strauss (drums) and Joe Jones (bass). They released three LPs, the second of which Dave Cobb co-produced. They signed with Emagine Records based in New York City.

Cobb played guitar and bass and was in this band for seven years. He was involved in the recording process, which got him interested in being in the studio, and led to him recording and producing other bands he was friends with. The record contract was very restrictive and took a long time to get out of.

Cobb moved to Los Angeles, California after he left his band. He lived there from 2004 to 2011, eventually moving to Nashville, Tennessee in 2011.

Cobb considers Shooter Jennings family. The two have worked together for a long time, since they met in California via Cobb's manager, Andrew Brightman. In 2005, Cobb and Jennings made the record Put the "O" Back in Country, together as their first collaborative work.

In 2009, thanks to his professional connection to Jennings, Cobb produced the Oak Ridge Boys' record The Boys Are Back, encouraging the band to record outside their standard catalog. The group then went on to cover songs by The White Stripes, Neil Young and John Lee Hooker.

Cobb and Sturgill Simpson originally first met at a Billy Joe Shaver concert. They then went on to complete Sturgill's record Metamodern Sounds in Country Music in only four days. Cobb has said he used many different vintage recording techniques, avoiding any electronic recording approaches for this particular album.

Cobb's approach of studio recording for Jason Isbell's Southeastern was an effort to chronicle an acoustic sound similar to what is found on Simon And Garfunkel's Bridge over Troubled Water, where a non-traditional recording environment was captured to provide an organic, live and "warm" sound.

Cobb met singer-songwriter Anderson East at Nashville's legendary Bluebird Cafe. The two ended up making East's record, Delilah, which was recorded at legendary FAME Studios in North Alabama's Muscle Shoals. Rodney Hall from FAME allowed the pair into the archives—in the vault they found George Jackson's song, "Find 'Em, Fool 'Em, Forget 'Em," which is now a track on Delilah. The video for "Find 'Em" is shot at FAME.

In 2013, Cobb began work producing Early Morning Shakes, the third studio album from Whiskey Myers, a Country Southern rock band from Palestine, Texas. The record was released on February 4, 2014.

Cobb's professional career is managed by Brightman Music. Cobb also runs Low Country Sound an imprint of Elektra that has a distribution deal with Atlantic Records. The debut project for Low Country Sound was the 2015 record Delilah, by Anderson East, who is currently signed with the label.

In 2016, Cobb produced and curated the collaborative album Southern Family. Cobb has said he was inspired by the album White Mansions. It was released on his Low Country Sound imprint. The record, which is characterized as a concept album, is focused on themes centered on family values and the artist's experiences growing up in the South. It contains song contributions by Zac Brown, Anderson East, Jason Isbell, Shooter Jennings, Jamey Johnson, Miranda Lambert, Morgane and Chris Stapleton among others. It was officially released on March 18, 2016.

In July 2016, Cobb began a long-term residency at RCA Studio A on Nashville's Music Row. The studio is adjacent to the famed RCA Studio B which opened in 1956. The title of Chris Stapleton's 2017 release From A Room: Vol. 1 refers to the album being recorded at the studio, as does The Oak Ridge Boys' 2018 release, 17th Avenue Revival, referring to the studio's location on 17th Avenue in Nashville.

In 2022, Cobb produced Gavin DeGraw's 8th album titled Face the River, 4 by Slash featuring Myles Kennedy and the Conspirators and Sammy Hagar and The Circle's album Crazy Times.

Artistic approach 
Cobb has said he focuses on the performer's voice, aiming for an end product which sounds natural. Cobb often plays guitar, and occasionally drums, on the records he produces. Cobb cites Jimmy Miller (Sticky Fingers, Exile on Main Street) as an important influence in his approach to producing, as well as Glyn Johns and Brendan O'Brien. Current influences include Gabriel Roth (Daptone Records).

Cobb also is known to not have a preference over analog recordings versus digital, instead believing the spontaneous nature of creativity as well as the inspiration derived from new discovery, predominantly drives the organic quality of a song.

Personal life 
Cobb lives in the Green Hills neighborhood of Nashville, Tennessee. Cobb is married; he and his wife, who is from Albania, have one daughter together.

One of Cobb's paternal cousins from Georgia is the singer-songwriter Brent Cobb. Additionally, Cobb said he grew up with musician Butch Walker.

Cobb has talked about the long-term passion that turned into a serious hobby where he explores different types of wine, especially from Paso Robles and other California vineyards.

Awards 

 2011: Grammy Award for Best Country Album (nominee) for Jamey Johnson's The Guitar Song
 2014: Americana Music Association, Album of the Year for Jason Isbell's Southeastern
 2014: Americana Music Association, Producer of the Year
 2014: Grammy Award for Best Americana Album (nominee) for Sturgill Simpson's Metamodern Sounds in Country Music
 2015: Grammy Award for Producer of the Year (nominee)
 2015: Grammy Award for Best Country Album for Chris Stapleton's Traveller – as producer
 2015: Grammy Award for Best Americana Album for Jason Isbell's Something More Than Free – as producer
 2016: Americana Music Association, Album of the Year, Jason Isbell's Something More Than Free
 2016: Americana Music Association, Producer of the Year
 2016: Music Row awards, Producer of the Year
 2017: Country Music Awards, Chris Stapleton's From A Room: Volume 1
 2017: Country Music Awards, Producer of the Year
 2018: Grammy Award for Best Americana Album (nominee) for Brent Cobb Shine On Rainy Day
 2018: Grammy Award for Best Americana Album for Jason Isbell and the 400 Unit's The Nashville Sound – as producer
 2018: Grammy Award for Best Country Album for Chris Stapleton's From A Room: Vol. 1 – as producer
 2019: Grammy Award for Best American Roots Song for Brandi Carlile's "The Joke" – as co-writer, producer
 2019: Grammy Award for Best Americana Album for Brandi Carlile's By the Way, I Forgive You  – as producer
 2022:  Grammy Award for Best Country Album for Chris Stapleton's Starting Over - as producer
 2022:  Grammy Award for Best Country Song for Chris Stapleton's "Cold" - as  songwriter and producer

Equipment 
 Console / board: HELIOS by Dick Swettenham (Abbey Road Studios)
 Recorder: Endless Analog's CLASP (Closed Loop Analog Signal Processor)
 Converters: Burl Audio B80 Mothership and the B32 Vancouver

Selected discography

See also 
 Albums produced by Dave Cobb
 RCA Studio A

References

External links 
 
 

Living people
American country record producers
Musicians from Nashville, Tennessee
American country songwriters
American male songwriters
American audio engineers
Businesspeople from Tennessee
Grammy Award winners
Musicians from Savannah, Georgia
Songwriters from Tennessee
1974 births
Songwriters from Georgia (U.S. state)
People from Green Hills, Tennessee